Matthew Bridges (14 July 1800 – 6 October 1894) was a British-Canadian hymnodist.

Life
Bridges was born in Essex, England on 14 July 1800, the youngest son of John Bridges of Maldon, Essex; the Rev Charles Bridges, a priest of the Church of England. He matriculated at Magdalen Hall, Oxford in 1831.

Matthew Bridges' career as an author began with his poem Jerusalem Regained at the age of 25 in 1825. Although in his early life Bridges (who was raised in a Church of England environment) was sceptical of Roman Catholicism as evidenced by his 1828 book The Roman Empire Under Constantine the Great, the influence of John Henry Cardinal Newman led him to convert to Roman Catholicism in 1848 at the age of 48, a faith to which he adhered for the remaining four-and-a-half decades of his life.

Later in life, Bridges lived for a time in Quebec, Canada, but returned to England and died in Sidmouth, Devon on 6 October 1894 at the age of 94. He is buried there in the cemetery of the Convent of the Assumption.

Works
Some of the more popular hymns written by Bridges include:
 Behold the Lamb of God! O Thou for sinners slain. This hymns is included in the 1861 edition of the Hymns Ancient and Modern.
Crown Him with Many Crowns
 Man of sorrows, wrapt in grief
 My God, accept my heart this day

References

1800 births
1894 deaths
Christian hymnwriters
English hymnwriters
Writers from Essex
English emigrants to Canada
Converts to Roman Catholicism from Anglicanism